This is the complete list of Asian Winter Games medalists in freestyle skiing from 1996 to 2017.

Men

Aerials

Moguls

Dual moguls

Women

Aerials

Moguls

Dual moguls

References

External links
 2003 Results
 2007 Results
 2011 Results

Freestyle skiing
medalists